Medinat Al-Shuhadaa Sport Club, is an Iraqi football team based in Al-Midaina District, Basra, that plays in Iraq Division Three.

Managerial history
  Bashar Al-Lami

See also
 2019–20 Iraq FA Cup
 2020–21 Iraq FA Cup
 2021–22 Iraq FA Cup

References

External links
 Medinat Al-Shuhadaa SC on Goalzz.com
 Iraq Clubs- Foundation Dates
 Basra Clubs Union

Football clubs in Iraq
Association football clubs established in 2018
Football clubs in Basra
Basra